Nguyễn Đức Chiến (born 24 August 1998) is a Vietnamese footballer who is playing for V.League 1 side Viettel.

Career statistics

Club

Notes

Honours
Viettel
V.League 1: 2020
Vietnam U23/Olympic
Southeast Asian Games: 2019

References

1998 births
Living people
Vietnamese footballers
Vietnam youth international footballers
Association football defenders
V.League 1 players
Viettel FC players
People from Hải Dương province